St. Thomas Episcopal Church is a historic church in Canyon City in the U.S. state of Oregon.

Background
It was built in 1876 in a Stick–Eastlake style/Jacobean style. The building was added to the National Register of Historic Places in 1974.

References

External links

Episcopal churches in Oregon
Buildings and structures in Grant County, Oregon
Churches completed in 1876
National Register of Historic Places in Grant County, Oregon
Churches on the National Register of Historic Places in Oregon
1876 establishments in Oregon
19th-century Episcopal church buildings
Stick-Eastlake architecture in Oregon